Mazlan bin Lazim (Jawi: مصلان بن لازم; born 25 December 1961) is a retired Malaysian police officer who served as the Deputy Inspector-General of Police of Malaysia (DIG) under Inspector-General (IGP) Acryl Sani Abdullah Sani from June to December 2021. He was the director of the Bukit Aman Logistics and Technology Department of the Royal Malaysia Police (PDRM) and had stints as police chief for Kelantan and Kuala Lumpur.

Education 
Mazlan graduated from Universiti Putra Malaysia with a Bachelor of Economic degree and also obtained a Master of Human Resources Management degree.

Police Career
Mazlan joined the Royal Malaysia Police as Cadet Assistant Superintendent of Police in 2 February 1986. He had served as Melaka Tengah Deputy District Police Chief; Tanah Merah Deputy District Police Chief, Kelantan, Shah Alam Deputy District Police Chief, Selangor; Training Staff Officer at Kuala Kubu Bharu Police College, Selangor and Budget Officer, Bukit Aman Training Division, Padang Besar District Police Chief, Perlis in 2002, Seberang Perai Utara District Police Chief, Penang in 2004, Head of Kelantan Contingent Criminal Investigation Department in 2006, Kelantan Police Chief in 2014, Director General of Department Protection, Prime Minister's Department in 2016, Kuala Lumpur Police Chief in 2017 and then Director of Logistics and Technology Department in 2020.

Honours 
  :
  Companion of the Order of Loyalty to the Crown of Malaysia (JSM) (2014)
 Commander of the Order of Loyalty to the Crown of Malaysia (PSM) – Tan Sri (2022)
  Royal Malaysia Police :
  Loyal Commander of the Most Gallant Police Order (PSPP) (2011)
 Courageous Commander of the Most Gallant Police Order (PGPP) (2021)
  :
 Member of the Exalted Order of the Crown of Kedah (AMK) (2006)
  :
 Companion of the Order of the Crown of Pahang (SMP) (2008)
 Knight Companion of the Order of the Crown of Pahang (DIMP) - Dato' (2010)
  :
 Commander of the Order of the Loyalty to the Crown of Kelantan (PSK) (2007)
  Knight Commander of the Order of the Loyalty to the Crown of Kelantan (DPSK) - Dato' (2011)
  Knight Grand Commander of the Order of the Loyalty to the Crown of Kelantan (SPSK) - Dato' (2015)
  :
  Companion Class I of the Exalted Order of Malacca (DMSM) - Datuk (2016)
  :
  Grand Commander of the Order of the Territorial Crown (SMW) – Datuk Seri (2018)
  :
 Distinguished Service Star (BCN) (2005)
 Commander of the Order of the Defender of State (DGPN) - Dato' Seri (2020)

References 

Companions of the Order of Loyalty to the Crown of Malaysia
Commanders of the Order of Loyalty to the Crown of Malaysia
1961 births
Living people
Malaysian police officers
People from Kedah
Malaysian people of Malay descent
Malaysian Muslims
University of Putra Malaysia alumni